Hotwire is a travel website that offers airline tickets, hotel rooms, rental cars, and vacation packages. It operates by selling off unsold travel inventory at discounted prices. The company is headquartered in San Francisco, CA, Hotwire, Inc. is an operating company of the Expedia Group, which also operates the website ClassicVacations, Expedia, Hotels.com, Orbitz, Travelocity and Egencia.

History 
Hotwire was launched in 2000, by Karl Peterson, Eric Grosse, Gregg Brockway, and Spencer Rascoff.  Initial funding came by founding partner Texas Pacific Group (TPG), a leading private equity firm that Karl Peterson used to work for, that invested an initial $75 million into Hotwire. Hotwire first offered tickets from six major airlines, that also invested into Hotwire's launch: American, Northwest (now Delta), Continental (now United), America West (now American), United, and US Airways (now American). Prior to its formal launch, Hotwire was codenamed Purple Demon.

In September 2003, IAC/InterActiveCorp announced its acquisition of Hotwire.com for $663 million. In 2004, an internet research firm estimated that through cross-advertising between Hotwire and Expedia, IAC was able to reach a total of an additional 1.5 million unique visitors to both websites monthly. 

Hotwire first launched with opaque airline tickets. The company started selling opaque hotels and rental cars a few months later. Package offerings started in 2003. In 2004, Hotwire began to offer select retail travel products. In June 2007, Hotwire removed all airfare booking fees.

Company affairs

Leadership 

Karl Peterson, one of Hotwire's four founding members, served as Hotwire's first CEO. In 2006, Hotwire was overseen by Founder and CFO (2004-2006) Eric Grosse. In January 2009, Eric Grosse became President of Expedia Worldwide and Clem Bason took over as President of the Hotwire Group. In 2013 Clem left the company and Henrik Kjellberg became President of hotwire.com, after joining from Expedia Affiliate Network, also as President.

Hotwire is managed by president Neha Parikh. 

Hotwire operates with one General Manager and six Vice Presidents on its management team. Hotwire began with 4 employees, and then grew to 80 within months. Currently, Hotwire has over 300 employees.

Customer and revenue structure 
As of 2019, the company reported more than 9.5 million unique visitors and 91 million pageviews per month, with a main audience (60%) aged 25-54 years old and 52% of visitors being male. In 2019, Hotwire's expected revenue was US$ 35 million. As a subsidiary brand of the Expedia Group, revenues for Hotwire have not been independently published.

Products 
Hotwire's products are based on online traffic and feature the main categories airline travel, car rental services, hotel reservation and vacation packages.

Operations 
When hotel rooms, airline seats, or rental cars go unsold, they are filled by travel companies through companies like Hotwire. Hotwire does not identify the participating companies until after the purchaser has paid so as not to directly compete with regular retail sales of the travel partners. This sales model is known as an "opaque". According to the Hotwire website, they deal with brand-name travel companies exclusively. This strategy allows Hotwire partners to clear out their supply and sell inventory that would otherwise go unsold. Hotwire reveals the prices and the travel dates of all their products upfront and does not sell via a "bidding" or "auction" model. Hotwire also offers a set of open travel APIs that can be used in travel applications.

Awards 
In 2007, J.D. Power and Associates Independent Travel Web Site Satisfaction StudySM recognized Hotwire for ranking "Highest in Customer Satisfaction for Independent Travel Web Sites" for the second year in a row.  In 2014, the company received Travel Weekly's Silver Magellan Award for their mobile app.

See also 
Expedia.com

References

External links 

 

Expedia Group
American travel websites
American companies established in 2000
Transport companies established in 2000
Internet properties established in 2000
2003 mergers and acquisitions
Online travel agencies
Companies based in San Francisco